Almalaguês (in old orthography, Almalaguez) is a civil parish in the municipality of Coimbra, Portugal. The population in 2011 was 3,111, in an area of 23.16 km².

See also 
Fountain of Calvo

References 

Freguesias of Coimbra